The 2015–16 Midland Football League season was the 2nd in the history of the Midland Football League, a football competition in England.

Premier Division

The Premier Division featured 17 clubs which competed in the previous season, along with five new clubs:
 Bardon Hill, promoted from the East Midlands Counties League
 Heanor Town, transferred from the Northern Counties East League
 Hereford, new club
 Highgate United, promoted from Division One
 Sporting Khalsa, promoted from the West Midlands (Regional) League

Four clubs have applied for promotion to Step 4: Alvechurch, Heanor Town, Hereford and Sporting Khalsa.

League table

Results

Locations

Division One

Division One featured 17 clubs which competed in the previous season, along with three new clubs:
 Coventry United, promoted from Division Two
 Heath Hayes, relegated from the Premier Division
 Leicester Road, promoted from Division Two

League table

Results

Locations

Division Two

Division Two featured 11 clubs which competed in the division last season, along with 3 new clubs:

Alvis Sporting Club, relegated from Division One 
Austrey Rangers, promoted from Division Three
Rostance Edwards, promoted from Division Three

League table

Division Three

Division Three featured 13 clubs which competed in the division last season, along with 3 new clubs:

AFC Solihull, from Stratford Alliance
Coventrians
Shipston Excelsior, from Stratford Alliance

League table

References

External links
 Midland Football League

2015–16
9